Diya Kumari (born 30 January 1971) is an Indian politician. She is a member of Indian Parliament from Rajsamand parliamentary seat, and a member of the Bharatiya Janata Party.

Kumari is the granddaughter of Man Singh II, the last ruling Maharaja of the princely state of Jaipur during the British Raj in India.

Early life and education
Kumari was born on 30 January 1971 to Bhawani Singh, a decorated Indian Army officer and hotelier, and Padmini Devi. She is the granddaughter of Man Singh II, the last ruling Maharaja of the princely state of Jaipur during the British Raj.

Kumari attended Modern School (New Delhi), G.D Somani Memorial School, Mumbai and Maharani Gayatri Devi Girls' Public School, Jaipur. She then did a decorative arts course in London.

She manages several properties, businesses, trusts and schools, including City Palace, Jaipur, which is also her residence; Jaigarh Fort, Amber and two trusts: Maharaja Sawai Man Singh II Museum Trust, Jaipur and the Jaigarh Public Charitable Trust; two schools: The Palace School and Maharaja Sawai Bhawani Singh School; and three hotels: Rajmahal Palace in Jaipur, Hotel Jaipur House at Mount Abu and Hotel Lal Mahal Palace, Jaipur.

Political career
Kumari joined the Bharatiya Janata Party on 10 September 2013 before a crowd of two-lakh people, in the presence of then Gujarat Chief Minister, Narendra Modi, BJP president, Rajnath Singh, and Vasundhara Raje, at a rally in Jaipur.  She contested the 2013 Rajasthan Legislative Assembly election as a BJP candidate from Sawai Madhopur, and became MLA. In 2019 she was elected as a Member of Parliament to the Lok Sabha from Rajsamand.

Personal life
Kumari has three children from her marriage to Narendra Singh.  The marriage ended in a divorce in  December 2018.

References

External links

1971 births
Politicians from Jaipur
Living people
Women in Rajasthan politics
Rajasthan MLAs 2013–2018
Lok Sabha members from Rajasthan
21st-century Indian women politicians
21st-century Indian politicians
India MPs 2019–present
Women members of the Lok Sabha
Indian princesses
Rajput princesses